Wahagnies is a commune in the Nord department in northern France.

Geography 
The commune is situated between Flandre and Artois and has a distance of 20 km to Lille and 35 km to Arras.

Population

Heraldry

Twin towns
Wahagnies is twinned with Böhl-Iggelheim (Rhineland-Palatinate, Germany)

See also
Communes of the Nord department

References

Communes of Nord (French department)
French Flanders